Sideways Arithmetic From Wayside School is a children's novel by Louis Sachar in the Wayside School series. The book primarily contains mathematical and logical puzzles for the reader to solve.

Plot
The first chapter introduces Sue, a new student in Mrs. Jewls's class. She is bewildered to discover that the arithmetic lessons involve adding words instead of numbers, using verbal arithmetic. Chapter 1 has 11 problems all about adding and subtracting using words.

In the next chapter, Sue complains that they're not supposed to do math that way, and says a few problems (for example, seven + four = eleven), which Mrs. Jewls states are impossible, and the reader has to figure out why the problems Sue mentioned are impossible. In the next chapter, Mrs. Jewls tells Sue that if she doesn't understand how to do math there, she should change to a different school, but when Sue inadvertently gets a question correct, Mrs. Jewls lets her stay. Chapter 4 also contains multiplication problems. Chapter 5 is about recess, where after a storyline is told, the students have to figure the answer of a few questions about what happened at recess. Chapter 6 involves Mrs. Jewls having trouble filling out report cards because she doesn't have all the grades, so she needs to figure out the answers on the quizzes in order to grade the students. Chapter 7 involves more logical questions, and Chapter 8 presents the reader with "true or false" tests in which the assertions refer to themselves. The last chapter is about Sue finally making a new friend, Joy (who stays after school trying to figure out her true or false test involving the liar's paradox), and they go home together after school.

Novels by Louis Sachar
Wayside School
1989 American novels
Puzzle books
Novels set in elementary and primary schools
1989 children's books